Bedřich Hošek (born 2 December 1911, date of death unknown) was a Czech middle-distance runner. He competed in the men's 1500 metres at the 1936 Summer Olympics.

References

External links
 

1911 births
Year of death missing
Athletes (track and field) at the 1936 Summer Olympics
Czech male middle-distance runners
Czech male steeplechase runners
Olympic athletes of Czechoslovakia
Place of birth missing